The 2020 General Tire 200 was the third stock car race of the 2020 ARCA Menards Series and the 59th iteration of the event. The race was held on Saturday, June 20, in Lincoln, Alabama at Talladega Superspeedway, a 2.66 miles (4.28 km) permanent triangle-shaped superspeedway. The race took the scheduled 76 laps to complete. At race's end, Drew Dollar of Venturini Motorsports would take advantage of a spinning Michael Self with two to go to take his first ever ARCA Menards Series career win and his first of the season. To fill out the podium, Ryan Repko of Venturini Motorsports and Bret Holmes of Bret Holmes Racing would finish second and third, respectively.

The race was the return of the ARCA Menards Series, after a 107-day delay due to the COVID-19 pandemic.

Background 

Talladega Superspeedway, originally known as Alabama International Motor Superspeedway (AIMS), is a motorsports complex located north of Talladega, Alabama. It is located on the former Anniston Air Force Base in the small city of Lincoln. The track is a tri-oval and was constructed in the 1960s by the International Speedway Corporation, a business controlled by the France family. Talladega is most known for its steep banking and the unique location of the start/finish line that's located just past the exit to pit road. The track currently hosts the NASCAR series such as the NASCAR Cup Series, Xfinity Series and the Camping World Truck Series. Talladega is the longest NASCAR oval with a length of 2.66-mile-long (4.28 km) tri-oval like the Daytona International Speedway, which also is a 2.5-mile-long (4 km) tri-oval.

Entry list

Practice 
The only 30-minute practice session was held on Saturday, June 20.

Starting lineup 
Due to the COVID-19 pandemic, qualifying was canceled. As a result, the lineup would be based on the rulebook: positions 1-20 would be based on 2019's owner points, and positions 21-30 would be based on a random draw. As a result, Ryan Repko of Venturini Motorsports would win the pole.

Full starting lineup

Race results

References 

2020 ARCA Menards Series
NASCAR races at Talladega Superspeedway
June 2020 sports events in the United States
2020 in sports in Alabama